Raise the bar (Icelandic: Hækkum rána) is an Icelandic documentary about the controversial journey of a girls basketball team under the direction of coach Brynjar Karl Sigurðsson.

The film was released at the Sjónvarp Síminn Premium streaming service on 10 February 2021 and immediately raised a controversy in Iceland due to Brynjar's coaching methods.

Premises
The film follows the journey of the a girls basketball team under the direction of coach Brynjar Karl Sigurðsson and their quest to be allowed to compete in boys tournaments.

Accolades
At the 2021 International Film Festival for Young Audiences, Filem'on, Raise the Bar won the award for best documentary.

References

External links
Icelandic Film Center profile

2021 documentary films
2021 films
Icelandic documentary films